This is a list of free-trade zones by country:

Africa

Morocco
 Tanger Free Zone
 Atlantic Free Zone Kenitra
 Free Zones at Tanger Med Ksar el Majaz Mellousa 1 and 2
 Free Zone in Dakhla and Laayoune:
 Free Storage Zone of hydrocarbons: Kebdana and Nador

Egypt
Egypt has nine free-trade zones:
 Alexandria Public free Zone
 Damietta Public Free Zone
 Ismailia Public Free Zone
 Keft Public Free Zone
 Media Production City Free Zone
 Nasr City Public Free Zone
 Port Said Public Free Zone
 Shebin El Kom Public Free Zone
 Suez Public Free Zone

Djibouti
Djibouti Free Zone

Eritrea
Massawa Free Trade Zone.

Gabon
 Zone économique spéciale de Nkok, at 30 km of Libreville

Ghana
Tema Export Processing Zone
Shama Land Bank
Sekondi Industrial Park
Ashanti Technology Park

Kenya
There are about 40 Export Processing Zones with "close to 40,000 workers employed and contribution of 10.7 % of national exports. Over 70% of EPZ output is exported to the USA under AGOA".

Libya
 Misrata Free Trade Zone

Namibia
 Walvis Bay Export Processing Zone
 Oshikango (namibia-Angola)Border Export Processing Zone

Nigeria
 Aluminium Smelter Company Free Trade Zone
 Border Free Trade
 Calabar Free Trade Zone
 Centenary Economic City
 Enugu Industrial Park (Free Zone Status), also known as, ENPOWER  
 Kano Free Trade Zone
 Ibom Science & Technology Park Free Zone
 Lekki Free Trade Zone
 Maigatari Border Free Trade Zone
 Nigeria International Commerce city
 Onne Oil and Gas Free Trade Zone
 Ogun-Guangdong Free Trade Zone
 Illela International Border Market
 LADOL Free Zone
 Lagos Free Trade Zone
 Snake Island Free Trade Zone
 Tinapa Resort & Leisure Free Trade Zone
 NAHCO Free Trade Zone

Tanzania
 Benjamin William Mkapa Special Economic Zone

Togo
Port of Lome Free Trade Zone/Export processing zone

Tunisia
 Bizerte
 Zarzis

Seychelles
 International Trade Zone

Americas

Argentina
 General Pico
 Tierra del Fuego Province

Bahamas
 Freeport, Bahamas

Brazil
 Bataguassu
 Free Economic Zone of Manaus
 Free Economic Zone of Ceara

Canada
 CentrePort Canada - Winnipeg, Manitoba
 Calgary Region Inland Port FTZ - Calgary, Alberta
 Port Alberta - Edmonton, Alberta
 Halifax, Nova Scotia - Halifax Gateway - Halifax, Nova Scotia
 Global Transportation Hub Authority - Regina, Saskatchewan
 Regional Municipality of Niagara - Niagara Trade Zone - Thorold, Ontario
 Cape Breton Regional Municipality - CBRM Foreign Trade Zone (Sydney), Nova Scotia
Windsor-Essex Foreign Trade Zone - Windsor, Ontario
 Saint John, New Brunswick - Foreign Trade Zone - Saint John, New Brunswick

Chile
 Zona Franca of Iquique

Colombia
 Zona Franca del Pacifico - Cali-Palmira, Colombia.
 Zona Franca Bogota - Bogota-Cundinamarca, Colombia 
 Zona Franca de Cucuta 
 Zona Franca Metropolitana S.a.s 
 Zona Franca de Occidente 
 Zona Franca Santander 
 Zona Franca de Tocancipa S.a 
 Zona Franca de Barranquilla 
 Zona Franca Brisa S.a 
 Zona Franca La Cayena 
 Zona Franca Las Americas 
 Zona Franca La Cayena (Barranquilla, Atlantico)

Dominican Republic
 Zona Franca Industrial La Palma LTD - Santiago
 Nigua Free Zone - Santo Domingo

El Salvador
 Zona Franca Santa Ana

Guatemala
 Zolic

Haiti
 Lafito Industrial Free Zone

Jamaica
 Jamaican Free Zones

Mexico
 Maquiladoras

Panama
 Colon Free Trade Zone

Paraguay
 Ciudad del Este

Peru
 Zona Franca of Tacna - ZOFRATACNA
 CETICOS Matarani
 CETICOS Ilo
 CETICOS Paita

United States

Uruguay
 Aguada Park (Itsen S.A.)-Uruguay
 Parque de las Ciencias (Parque de las Ciencias S.A.)-Uruguay
 WTC Free Zone (WTC Free Zone S.A.)-Uruguay
 Zona Franca de Colonia (Grupo Continental S.A.)-Uruguay
 Zona Franca Colonia Suiza (Colonia Suiza S.A.)-Uruguay
 Zona Franca Floridasur (Florida S.A.)-Uruguay
 Zona Franca Libertad (Lideral S.A.)-Uruguay
 Zona Franca Nueva Palmira (Nueva Palmira)-Uruguay
 Zona Franca Río Negro (Río Negro S.A.)-Uruguay
 Zona Franca Rivera (Rivera)-Uruguay
 Zona Franca UPM (UPM Fray Bentos S.A.)-Uruguay
 Zonamerica Business & Technology Park - Uruguay

Asia

ASEAN
 UNIDO Viet Nam (United Nations Industrial Development Organization) has compiled in 2015 a list of Special Economic Zones in the ASEAN Economic Community in a report titled "Economic Zones in the ASEAN" written by Arnault Morisson.

Bahrain
 Bahrain Logistics Zone

Bangladesh
 Bangladesh Export Processing Zone Authority
 Chittagong Export Processing Zone
 Karnaphuli Export Processing Zone
 Dhaka Export Processing Zone
 Comilla Export Processing Zone
 Adamjee Export Processing Zone
 Mongla Export Processing Zone
 Ishwardi Export Processing Zone
 Uttara Export Processing Zone

China

Jiujiang Free-Trade Zone
Tianjin Free-Trade Zone
Shanghai Free-Trade Zone
Fujian Free-Trade Zone
Guangdong Free-Trade Zone
Liaoning Free Trade Zone
Zhejiang Zone
Henan Free Trade Zone
Hubei Free Trade Zone
Sichuan Free Trade Zone
Shaanxi Free Trade Zone
Chongqing Free Trade Zone

India

 Kandla Special Economic Zone, India. India was one of the first in Asia to recognize the effectiveness of the Export Processing Zone (EPZ) model in promoting exports, with Asia's first EPZ set up in Kandla in 1965. With a view to overcome the shortcomings experienced on account of the multiplicity of controls and clearances; absence of world-class infrastructure, and an unstable fiscal regime and with a view to attract larger foreign investments in India, the Special Economic Zones (SEZs) Policy was announced in April 2000.
SuRSEZ is the First Operating Zone in the private sector in India. The track record of SuRSEZ in the last 5 years speaks for itself. From a level of about Rs.62 crores in 2000–01, exports from SuRSEZ rose to Rs. 2400 crores in the year 2005–06.
AMRL SEZ and FTWZ in Nanguneri Taluk of Tirunelvelli District is spread over 2518 Acres of development. Out of which 1618 acres are dedicated for multiproduct industrial space; 800 acres are planned for lifestyle zone and 100 acres of Free Trade and Warehousing Zone in south Tamil Nadu is being developed. The FTWZ has a grade A warehouse 100,000 sq ft out of which approximately 20,000 sq ft is already occupied.
 Inspira Pharma and Renewable Energy Park, Aurangabad, Maharashtra, India
 Sricity Multi product SEZ, part of Sricity which is a developing satellite city in Andhra Pradesh, India
 Arshiya International Ltd, India's first Free Trade and Warehousing Zone The largest multi-product free-trade and warehousing infrastructure in India. Arshiya's first 165-acre FTWZ is operational in Panvel, Mumbai, and is to be followed by one in Khurja near Delhi. Arshiya's Mega Logistics Hub at Khurja to have 135 acre FTWZ, 130 acre Industrial and Distribution Hub (Distripark) & 50 acre Rail siding. Arshiya International will be developing three more Free Trade and Warehousing zones in Central, South and East of India.
 Cochin Special Economic Zone is a Special Economic Zone in Cochin, in the State of Kerala in southwest India, set up for export- oriented ventures. The Special Economic Zone is a foreign territory within India with special rules for facilitating foreign direct investment. The Zone is run directly by the Government of India. Cochin SEZ is a multi-product Zone. Cochin is strategically located. It is in southwest India, just 11 nautical miles off the international sea route from Europe to the Pacific Rim. Cochin is being developed by the Dubai Ports International as a container transhipment terminal with direct sailings to important markets of the world, which could position it as Hub for South Asia.
 Hardware Park, Hyderabad
 Madras Export Processing Zone

Indonesia
 Batam Free Trade Zone
 Bintan Free Trade Zone
 Karimun Free Trade Zone
 Sabang Free Trade Zone
 Tanjung Pinang Free Trade Zone

Iran
 Anzali Free Zone, Gilan province
 Aras Free Zone, East Azerbaijan province
 Arvand Free Zone, Khouzestan province
 Chabahar Free Trade-Industrial Zone
 Kish Island, Hormozgan Province
 Maku Free Zone, West Azarbaijan province
 Qeshm Island, Hormozgan province
 Imam Khomeini Airport city Free Zone, Tehran Province
 Farzazan Pars Company, Tehran Province

Israel 

 Eilat Free Trade Zone

Japan
 Okinawa FTZ Naha, Okinawa, Japan and Nakagusuku Free Trade Zone

Jordan
 Diamonds Private Free zone
 Aqaba Special Economic Zone Authority
 Jordan Media City

Korea, North
 Rason Special Economic Zone

Malaysia
 Bayan Lepas Free Industrial Zone, Penang
 Hulu Klang Free Trade Zone (Statchippac, Texas Instrument)
 Kulim Hi-Tech Park, Kedah
 Melaka Batu Berendam Free Trade Zone (Texas Instrument, Dominant Semiconductor, Panasonic)
 Pasir Gudang Free Trade Zone, Johor
 Port Klang Free Zone, Klang, Selangor
 Sungai Way Free Trade Zone (Western Digital, Free Scale, etc.)
 Teluk Panglima Garang Free Trade Zone (Toshiba, etc.)
 Port of Tanjung Pelepas Free Zone, Johor

Oman
 Al-Mazyunah Free Zone
 Special Economic Zone at Duqm
 Salalah Free Zone, Salalah (www.sfzco.com)
 Sohar Free Zone, Sohar (www.soharportandfreezone.com)

Pakistan
 Gawadar port free trade zone
 Karachi Export Processing Zone

Philippines

Saudi Arabia
 Jazan Economic City
 King Abdullah Economic City
 Prince Abdulaziz Bin Mousaed Economic City

Tajikistan
 Panj Free Economic Zone
 Sughd Free Economic Zone

United Arab Emirates

Abu Dhabi
 Khalifa Port Free Trade Zone

Dubai

 Dubai Multi Commodities Centre
 Dubai Airport Freezone
 Dubai Internet City
 Dubai Knowledge Village
 Dubai Media City
 Dubai Silicon Oasis
 International Media Production Zone
 Jebel Ali Free Zone

Ajman
 Ajman Free Zone

Fujairah
 Creative City

Umm Al Quwain
 Umm Al Quwain Free Trade Zone (UAQFTZ)

Ras Al Khaimah
 Ras Al Khaimah Economic Zone

Yemen
 Aden

Europe

Belarus
 Brest FEZ
 China-Belarus Industrial Park
 Grodno FEZ
 Mogilev Free Enterprise Zone
 FEZ Gomel-Raton

Croatia
Land free zone:
Krapina–Zagorje Free Zone (in liquidation)
Danube Free Zone of Vukovar
Free Zone of Kukuljanovo (inactive)
Free Zone of Port of Rijeka – Škrljevo
Free Zone of Split–Dalmatia (in liquidation)
Free Zone of Zagreb
Port free zone:
 Free Zone of Port of Ploče
 Free Zone of Port of Pula
 Free Zone of Port of Rijeka
 Free Zone of Port of Split

Ireland
 Shannon Free Zone

Italy
 Porto Franco di Trieste
Porto Franco di Venezia (Venice)
Livigno
Campione d'Italia (Until 1 January 2020)

Latvia
 Liepāja Special Economic Zone

Lithuania
 Akmenė Free Economic Zone
 Kaunas Free Economic Zone
 Klaipėda Free Economic Zone
 Kėdainiai Free Economic Zone
 Marijampolė Free Economic Zone
 Panevėžys Free Economic Zone
 Šiauliai Free Economic Zone

Moldova 
Moldova has seven Free Trade Zones, called in the national legislation Free Economic Areas. 
 FEA “Expo-Business-Chişinău”
 FEA “Bălţi”
 FEA PP “Valkaneş” 
 FEA “Ungheni-Business”
 FEA “Tvardiţa”
 FEA PP “Otaci-Business”
 FEA PP “Taraclia”

Poland
 Special Economic Zone EURO-PARK MIELEC
 Wałbrzych Special Economic Zone "INVEST-PARK"

Romania
 Constanta South Free Zone
 Basarabi Free Zone
 Giurgiu Free Zone
 Arad-Curtici Free Zone
 Sulina Free Zone
 Galati Free Zone
 Braila Free Zone

Georgia
 Kutaisi Free Industrial Zone
 Poti Free Industrial Zone

See also
List of free economic zones
List of special economic zones

References

Tax avoidance
Free trade
International trade-related lists